In mathematics, a colored matroid is a matroid whose elements are labeled from a set of colors, which can be any set that suits the purpose, for instance the set of the first n positive integers, or the sign set {+, −}.

There has also been study of optimization problems on matroids where the objective function of the optimization depends on the set of colors chosen as part of a matroid basis.

See also
Bipartite matroid
Rota's basis conjecture

References

Matroid theory